Nuevo Imperial District is one of sixteen districts of the province Cañete in Peru.

Its boundaries are:

North: District Quilmaná.
South: District Lunahuaná.
East: District Lunahuaná.
West: Imperial district and district of San Vicente de Cañete.

References